Rajid Ahamed (born 14 December 1995), known by his stage name Yung Raja, is a Singaporean-Tamil rapper and songwriter.  He is known for his use of Tanglish, a mix of Tamil and English, in his raps.

Early life 
Rajid Ahamed was born in 1995, in Singapore, to Tamil-Muslim parents from Thanjavur Tamil Nadu. Ahamed has three elder sisters, which led to him being given the nickname "chinna thambi" (Tamil meaning: younger brother), and subsequently inspiring the first half of his stage name. The second half of his stage name, Raja, pays tribute to the Indian composer, Ilaiyaraaja.

Rajid Ahamed attended Ngee Ann Polytechnic and graduated with a diploma in mass communications.

Career
Before becoming a singer-songwriter, Ahamed was a child actor acting in local dramas and having cameos in films including Ah Boys to Men 3: Frogmen and Joker Game.

Released in early 2018, Yung Raja's debut single was a remix of "Gucci Gang" by Lil Pump, titled "Poori Gang". Yung Raja came to prominence after being featured in an episode of the Malaysia hip hop web-series, 16 Baris, in 2018. The same year, he rose to prominence with the single "Mustafa", which was followed by "Mad Blessings". A sequel to "Mad Blessings", titled "The Dance Song", was released in October 2020.

In 2019, Ahamed hosted the Asian reboot of YO! MTV Raps alongside Kim Lee. Yung Raja was one of six inaugural signees of Def Jam Southeast Asia (alongside Joe Flizzow, Daboyway, Fariz Jabba and A.Nayaka) in September 2019. After becoming the first Asian artist signed to Alamo Records, he released the single "Mami" in March 2021. Yung Raja gained international attention after "Mami" was featured in a The Tonight Show segment when Jimmy Fallon roasted the song's repetitive hook.

Influences
Yung Raja was influenced by musicians including A.R. Rahman, FlightSch, Alyph, Sid Sriram, and Drake.

Discography

Extended plays 
 One 65 (2021)
 Mike (2021)

Singles

As lead artist

As featured artist

Guest appearances

References

Living people
1995 births
Singaporean rappers
Singaporean people of Indian descent
Singaporean songwriters
Tamil rappers
Ngee Ann Polytechnic alumni
Singaporean Muslims
Singaporean people of Tamil descent